Anita Indira Anand  (born May 20, 1967) is a Canadian lawyer and politician who has served as the minister of national defence since 2021. She has represented the riding of Oakville in the House of Commons since the 2019 federal election, sitting as a member of the Liberal Party. From 2019 to 2021, she served as minister of public services and procurement and oversaw Canada's procurement of vaccines and personal protective equipment during the COVID-19 pandemic. As minister of national defence, Anand has led Canada's efforts to provide military aid to Ukraine since the 2022 Russian invasion of Ukraine. She is the first Hindu to become a federal minister in Canada.

Early life and education 
Anita Indira Anand was born in Kentville, Nova Scotia. Her parents were both Indian physicians; her mother Saroj D. Ram (now deceased) was an anesthesiologist, and her father S.V. (Andy) Anand was a general surgeon. Her father was from Tamil Nadu and her mother was from Punjab. Anand has two sisters: Gita Anand, who is an employment lawyer in Toronto, and Sonia Anand, who is a physician and researcher at McMaster University.

The family relocated to Ontario in 1985 and Anand and her husband John raised their family in Oakville. The couple has four children.

Anand holds four degrees: a Bachelor of Arts (honours) in political studies from Queen's University; a Bachelor of Arts (honours) in jurisprudence from Wadham College, Oxford University; a bachelor of laws from Dalhousie University; and a master of laws from the University of Toronto. She was called to the Ontario Bar in 1994.

Anand has held academic positions at Yale, Queen's University and Western University. Before her election, Anand was a law professor at the University of Toronto.

Academic and legal career 
Before her political career, Anand was a professor at the University of Toronto Faculty of Law specializing in corporate governance and the regulation of capital markets. She was previously the J.R. Kimber Chair in Investor Protection and Corporate Governance at the Faculty. As of October 2019, Anand is on leave from the University of Toronto Faculty of Law  for the duration of her time as an elected official.

Anand began her legal career as an associate at Torys from 1994 to 1997 (with leave to pursue her master's degree), after articling at Torys from 1992 to 1993. She then pursued her teaching career by serving as assistant professor (adjunct) from 1997 to 1999 at the Faculty of Law of Western University. In 1999, she became assistant professor in the Faculty of Law at Queen's University, obtaining tenure and advancing to the rank of associate professor in 2003. She received a U.S.-Canada Fulbright award in 2005 and attended Yale Law School as a visiting lecturer in law (fall 2005) teaching comparative corporate governance. She was also visiting Olin scholar in law and economics at Yale Law School (2005-2006).

Anand left Queen's University for the Faculty of Law, University of Toronto in 2006 where she was a full professor. She served as associate dean from 2007 to 2009. From 2010 to 2019, Anand also served as the academic director of the Centre for the Legal Profession, as well as for its Program on Ethics in Law and Business. At the time of her election, she was a senior fellow of Massey College, as well as being cross-appointed to the Rotman School of Management as the director of policy and research at the Capital Markets Research Institute, and to the Munk School of Global Affairs and Public Policy at the University of Toronto.

On September 17, 2019, it was announced that Anand would receive the Yvan Allaire Medal from the Royal Society of Canada. The medal is bestowed annually for an outstanding contribution in governance of private and public organizations. The Society stated that Anand's research "significantly altered global thinking about best practices for boards of directors, including the importance of diversity on boards".

Political career

2019 federal election 
On June 12, 2019, Anita Anand won the Liberal nomination for the riding of Oakville, Ontario, after the incumbent John Oliver announced that he would not run in the 2019 election. She defeated former member of Provincial Parliament Kevin Flynn and lawyer Tamur Shah for the nomination. On October 21, 2019, Anand won the riding of Oakville with 30,265 votes.

Anand was sworn in as the member of Parliament for Oakville on November 22, 2019, to represent Oakville in the House of Commons in the 43rd Canadian Parliament.

Minister of Public Services and Procurement 
On November 20, 2019, Anand was sworn in as a member of the Privy Council and as procurement minister at Rideau Hall.

Procurement of personal protective equipment during the COVID-19 pandemic 
At the beginning of the COVID-19 pandemic in Canada, Anand and her department acted quickly to bulk buy personal protective equipment (PPE) and medical supplies for Canada's health care system. In order to ensure reliable access to PPE in a hyper-competitive market, Anand and her department adopted an aggressive procurement strategy and engaged a large number of suppliers to diversify Canada's supply chains. Through this strategy, the federal government also funded large-scale domestic production of medical supplies.

The pandemic caused the federal government to rapidly increase its usual procurement tempo in order to purchase rapid tests, reagents, and swabs used for laboratory-based testing. In April 2021, Anand told the House of Commons Health Committee that Public Services and Procurement Canada had procured over 2.5 billion articles of personal protective equipment, "with a substantial amount of that equipment being made right here, at home."

Procurement of COVID-19 vaccines 
Beginning in the summer of 2020, the Canadian government signed contracts with the producers of seven leading COVID-19 vaccine candidates, and the producers of supplies needed to package and administer those vaccines. Anand told The New York Times that "because we do not know which vaccine [...] is going to be successful, ultimately we must bet on multiple vaccines at the same time." Summing up her approach, she stated, "We are not putting all our eggs in one basket."

Initially, Canada's target was to receive enough vaccines to fully immunize all eligible Canadians by September 30, 2021. Anand told The Guardian that she pressed "very, very aggressively for early deliveries from the suppliers." Negotiations for early delivery were successful, allowing Canada to meet and then surpass its immunization target two months ahead of schedule. By the end of July 2021, Canada had received a cumulative total of more than 66.4 million vaccines.

By August 2021, Canada had attained the highest vaccination rate in the world.

Anand also worked to finalize Canada's agreements with vaccine producers regarding the procurement and delivery of COVID-19 vaccine doses for children. After Health Canada approved the Pfizer–BioNTech COVID-19 vaccine for use in paediatric populations under the age of 12 years on November 19, 2021, the first paediatric doses of the vaccine arrived in Canada two days later, on November 21, 2021.

2021 federal election 
Anand was re-elected to Parliament following the 2021 Canadian federal election. She defeated Conservative Kerry Colborne with 46 per cent of the vote.

Minister of National Defence

Culture change and inclusion in the Canadian Armed Forces 
On October 26, 2021, Anand was sworn in as Minister of National Defence at Rideau Hall. She is only the second woman in Canadian history to take on the role of national defence minister, after former prime minister Kim Campbell in the 1990s. Anand stated that her top priority is tackling sexual misconduct and building a durable culture change in the Canadian Armed Forces.

On November 4, 2021, Anand announced that she accepted in full an interim recommendation from former Supreme Court of Canada Justice Louise Arbour that the investigation and prosecution of military sexual misconduct cases be referred to Canada's civilian justice system. In a statement to The Globe and Mail, retired Colonel and military lawyer Michel Drapeau called the decision a "welcomed sign of leadership" and "a timely and powerful signal to the military justice system and victims that changes are coming."

On November 19, 2021, Anand gave her first major speech as Minister of National Defence as the keynote speaker at the Halifax International Security Forum. Anand laid out her three main priorities: building a durable culture change in the Canadian Forces, better equipping Canada's military by raising military spending, and ensuring that Canada continues to support peace and stability around the world through its military deployments.

On November 25, 2021, General Wayne Eyre was appointed as Chief of the Defence Staff on Anand's recommendation.

On December 13, 2021, Anand offered an official apology on behalf of the Government of Canada to all those affected by sexual misconduct in the Canadian Armed Forces and Department of National Defence. She was joined by General Wayne Eyre, Chief of the Defence Staff, who apologized on behalf of the military, and Deputy Minister Jody Thomas, who apologized on behalf of the department.

On May 30, 2022, Anand was joined by Louise Arbour, General Wayne Eyre, and Deputy Minister Bill Matthews to release the final report of the Independent External Comprehensive Review into Sexual Misconduct and Sexual Harassment in the Canadian Armed Forces and Department of National Defence. Anand accepted the report in its entirety and "welcomed" all 48 recommendations. She announced that work to implement 17 of them would begin immediately, and DND and the CAF will work to quickly analyze and provide the path forward for the remaining recommendations. In an interview, Anand later said, "“The efficacy of our armed forces, the ability for us to grow and continue to defend our country and engage in operations nationally and internationally, depends on us getting this right. And that is why it is so important to me personally as well as to our government.”

On July 9, 2022, in Truro, Anand and Prime Minister Trudeau offered the Government of Canada's official apology to the members and descendants of No. 2 Construction Battalion, an all-Black battalion that faced anti-Black racism and discrimination during its service to Canada in World War I. “I am committed to eliminating systemic racism so that the discrimination faced by the No. 2 Construction Battalion, and those who followed, never happens again,” Anand said.

On December 16, 2022, Anand presented a report to Parliament detailing her official response to all 48 of Louise Arbour's 48 recommendations to respond to sexual misconduct and harassment in Canada's military and defence department, pursuant to Arbour's ask that Anand inform Parliament by the end of 2022 of any recommendations that the government would reject. Anand rejected none of the recommendations. “We need to attract Canadians to the Canadian Armed Forces. We need to address the reconstitution issue head-on and the way we do that, at least in part, is to evidence a sincere commitment to cultural change,” she said.

War in Ukraine 

In late January 2022, Anand and Prime Minister Trudeau announced that Canada would extend its training mission in Ukraine, Operation Unifier, by three years, and raise the ceiling of deployed personnel from 200 to 400. In announcing the extension, Anand stated, "The biggest contribution that Canada can make to Ukraine right now is people. We have trained, our soldiers have trained over 30,000 Ukrainian soldiers. We should not underestimate the importance of this training mission."

A few days later, Anand visited Kyiv as a sign of Canadian solidarity, all while Russia significantly increased its military buildup around Ukraine. Anand stated that "Russia has a choice, and that choice is to negotiate with a view to de-escalation" or it will "face severe sanctions and consequences." While in Ukraine, Anand met with Ukraine's Defence Minister Oleksii Reznikov to discuss military aid to Ukraine, including in the area of cybersecurity. Shortly after Anand's visit, in late February the Canadian government did authorize and deliver a $7.8 million package of lethal weapons to Ukraine.

Just days before the Russian invasion of Ukraine, Anand announced a significant expansion of Canada's contribution to NATO operations in Europe. Under the umbrella of Operation Reassurance she announced the deployment of approximately 120 members of an artillery battery to join the Canadian-led NATO Enhanced Forward Presence battle group in Latvia, and the deployment of an additional Halifax-class frigate to NATO maritime forces.

On 19 March HMCS Halifax (FFH 330) left port and joined NATO maritime forces in the Baltic region. At the departure ceremony, Anand stated, "At this time it is so important for us all to be united, to stand together, to stand against unwarranted and illegal Russian aggression, and to stand up for peace, deterrence and the defensive posture on which NATO is built."

Following Russia's invasion, Anand announced several packages of additional military aid to Ukraine throughout February and March 2022, including Carl Gustaf anti-armour weapons, rockets, helmets, gas masks, and night-vision goggles. Further types of military aid announced by Anand included fragmentation vests and meal packs, 4,500 M72 rocket launchers and up to 7,500 hand grenades, and funding to enable Ukraine to purchase modern satellite imagery. Anand also announced the procurement and donation to Ukraine of Canadian-made, specialized cameras for Bayraktar TB-2 drones.

On March 8, during a trip to Latvia, Anand and Prime Minister Trudeau announced the multi-year renewal of Operation Reassurance.

On April 14, at Canadian Forces Base (CFB) Trenton, Anand announced that the Canadian Armed Forces would deploy between 100 and 150 troops to Poland, to assist with Polish efforts to manage the flow of, and care for, Ukrainians fleeing the Russian invasion.

In late April 2022, Anand announced further military aid for Ukraine. On April 22, 2022, Anand confirmed that Canada had delivered M777 howitzers to Ukrainian Forces. At a conference of the Ukraine Defense Consultative Group at Ramstein Air Base, Canada announced that it had signed a contract for eight armoured vehicles for Ukraine. Just days later, Anand confirmed that the Canadian Armed Forces had begun to train Ukrainian forces in the use of the howitzers.

On April 28, 2022, Anand met with U.S. Defense Secretary Lloyd Austin during her first official visit to the United States. Anand and Austin told reporters that they had discussed further military aid to Ukraine and modernization of the North American Aerospace Defense Command.

On May 8, an additional $50 million in military assistance to Ukraine was announced, including 18 drone cameras, $15 million for high-resolution satellite imagery, additional ammunition and small arms. On May 24, Anand announced at the Ukrainian Cultural Centre in Victoria that Canada had purchased more than 20,000 rounds of artillery ammunition for Ukraine, which are compatible with M777 artillery guns provided by Canada, at a cost of $98 million CAD. Anand stated that “Canadian aid continues to flow into Ukraine, and we are working around the clock to identify and provide even more military aid to Ukraine.” On June 15, at a meeting of the Ukraine Defense Contact Group in Brussels, Anand announced that Canada would donate $9 million worth of M777 howitzer replacement barrels to Ukraine.

At the 2022 NATO Leaders Summit in Madrid, Anand signed an agreement with Latvia's Defence Minister, Artis Pabriks, to upgrade the Canadian-led NATO Enhanced Forward Presence Battle Group in Latvia to a brigade size. At the summit, Canada also committed new military aid for Ukraine, specifically, six drone cameras and up to 39 armoured combat support vehicles. Days later, Anand visited General Dynamics Land Systems' facility in London, Ontario to meet with workers who assemble the armoured combat support vehicles, and said in an interview, “GDLS armoured vehicles are top of the line and we want to provide vehicles that are readily usable, easily accessible and able to be repaired if damaged. Ukraine asked for these.”

In July 2022, at the 15th Conference of Defense Ministers of the Americas in Brasília, Anand led an effort to convince other countries present to denounce the 2022 Russian invasion of Ukraine. Anand told Politico that “Canada and I, as the representative here, felt that it's very important to voice this concern in a tangible way here at the conference... There is an impact of the Russian invasion on this region, a negative impact on economies here, on food security in our hemisphere.” Canada's efforts were successful, with the conference's final declaration stating, "The conflicts present around the world, such as the invasion of Ukraine and the violent acts by armed groups that terrorize the population in Haiti are not legitimate means to settle disputes, therefore the Member States of the CDMA, seek peaceful solutions as soon as possible." The Declaration also included a disclaimer by Canada, Colombia, Dominican Republic, Ecuador, Guatemala, Haiti, Paraguay, the United States of America and Uruguay, reiterating these countries "condemnation in the strongest terms of the Russian Federation’s illegal, invasion of Ukraine."

On August 4, 2022, Anand announced the deployment of up to 225 Canadian Armed Forces personnel to the United Kingdom to train new recruits to the Armed Forces of Ukraine, under Operation Unifier. Anand said, "Training missions like this, assisting our allies and our partners when they are under attack, is what we do... It is a priority for us as a country to stand shoulder to shoulder with Ukraine and with our allies." British defence minister Ben Wallace praised the announcement, stating, "Canada's expertise will provide a further boost to the program and ensure that the Ukrainian men and women coming to the U.K. to train to defend their country will get a wide pool of experience and skills from both U.K. forces and our international partners."

In September 2022, Anand told the Canadian Broadcasting Corporation that it would boost the capacity of the Royal Canadian Air Force hub in Prestwick, Scotland, by adding a third C-130 Hercules aircraft and boosting its presence to 55 personnel, thus enabling it to deliver additional military aid to Ukraine.

Days after Russian missiles struck Kyiv and other civilian centres in Ukraine, Anand visited Warsaw on October 11, 2022, and met with her Polish counterpart Mariusz Błaszczak. While in Warsaw, Anand announced the deployment of approximately forty Canadian Armed Forces combat engineers to Poland to train Ukrainian sappers under Operation Unifier. Referring to the Russian missile attacks on Ukrainian cities, Anand said the same day, "Canada wholeheartedly condemns those brutal strikes against civilian targets and infrastructure, adding, "those strikes constitute a war crime."

The next day, at a meeting of the U.S.-led Ukraine Defense Contact Group in Brussels, Anand announced an additional $47 million CAD in military aid to Ukraine, including "artillery rounds, satellite communications, winter clothing and drone cameras, among other assistance."

On November 14, 2022, Canada announced an additional $500 million in military aid for Ukraine, bringing its total commitment of military aid to over $1 billion CAD since February 2022.

On November 16, 2022, Canada announced the extension of Operation Unifier in the United Kingdom through the end of 2023. At a meeting of the Ukraine Defense Contact Group later that day, Anand also announced that Canada would contribute $34 million in additional military aid to Ukraine, in the form of drone cameras, additional winter clothing, and satellite services.

Following Ukrainian officials' repeated asks to NATO countries for air defence systems, Anand announced on January 10, 2023 that Canada would donate a NASAMS air defence system to Ukraine at a cost of approximately $406 million. "In the face of Russia’s brutal airstrikes on Ukraine, this air defence system will help to protect Ukrainian population centres and critical infrastructure against drone, missile, and aircraft attacks,” Anand said. Oleksii Reznikov, Ukraine’s defence minister, said that the system will “considerably reinforce” Ukraine’s defence capabilities.

Anand visited Kyiv and Irpin during a trip to Ukraine on January 18, 2023. There, she met with Ukrainian Defence Minister Oleksii Reznikov and announced that Canada would donate 200 Roshel Senator armoured personnel carriers manufactured in Mississauga, Ontario. Referring to the Senator APCs, Anand said, "I have heard repeatedly that Ukrainian troops appreciate their maneuverability and their adaptability," while speaking to the press alongside Minister Reznikov. This announcement marked the full allocation of the additional $500 million in military aid to Ukraine announced by Canada on November 14, 2022.

Anand announced on January 26, 2023 that Canada would donate four of the Canadian Army's Leopard 2 main battle tanks to Ukraine, with the possibility of more to follow. "These heavily armoured and highly protected vehicles provide soldiers with a tactical advantage on the battlefield, thanks to their excellent mobility, their firepower and there's their survivability," she said. Anand added, "these tanks will allow Ukraine to liberate even more of its territory and defend its people from Russia's brutal invasion."

NORAD and continental defence 

Anand's 2021 mandate letter from Prime Minister Trudeau instructed her to "work with the United States to modernize the North American Aerospace Defence Command."

On June 20, 2022, at CFB Trenton, Anand announced a five-point NORAD modernization plan that is estimated to cost approximately $40 billion over twenty years. Anand said that there was “pressing need” to respond to threats like hypersonic and cruise missiles, and declared that the plan would begin "NORAD’s next chapter.” Anand described the plan as “the most significant upgrade to NORAD from a Canadian perspective in almost four decades.”

Anand declared, “In close coordination with the United States, we will establish the backbone of a brand-new northern approaches surveillance system to enhance surveillance and early warning threats to our continent," adding that this new system will “essentially push our line of sight further north, ensuring we will be able to respond to fast moving threats like hypersonics.”

U.S. Ambassador to Canada David Cohen welcomed the funding, stating, “The United States looks forward to continuing to strengthen our collaboration with Canada on continental defence and security, including in the Arctic."

During a visit to Labrador on August 24, 2022, Anand confirmed that CFB Goose Bay would be one of four northern locations to receive basing upgrades under the $15.68 billion allocated for infrastructure upgrades in Canada's NORAD modernization plan.

On August 25, 2022, Trudeau, Anand, and other Canadian ministers welcomed NATO Secretary General Jens Stoltenberg to Cambridge Bay, Nunavut, for the first-ever visit of a NATO Secretary General to the Canadian High Arctic.

On January 9, 2023, Anand announced that Canada had finalized the acquisition of 88 Lockheed Martin F-35 Lightning II fighter jets for the Royal Canadian Air Force. In a statement, Anand said, “As the rules-based international order is challenged around the world, the F-35 will be essential for protecting Canadians, enhancing Arctic security and national sovereignty, and enabling Canada to meet its NATO, NORAD and other obligations well into the future." At a press conference, she added, "these projects will sharpen our military edge to keep Canadians safe and they will create economic opportunities for our country."

Indo-Pacific 
Days after the Russian invasion of Ukraine in February 2022, Anand told the Ottawa Conference on Security and Defence that "Europe is not the only fault line in the global security environment at the current time." She spoke about the need to be "cognizant of China’s range of assertive activities in the Indo-Pacific region and around the world," and stated, "the patterns are there for all to see, frankly.” Anand described Chinese activity in the East and South China Seas as "coercive," also citing theft of intellectual property, “irresponsible and very concerning behaviour in cyberspace," and the Detention of Michael Spavor and Michael Kovrig.

While in Singapore to attend the Shangri-La Dialogue in June 2022, Anand addressed Chinese interceptions of Royal Canadian Air Force aircraft. She told Reuters, “The interceptions by the Chinese of our (aircraft) are very concerning and unprofessional and we need to ensure that the safety and security of our pilots is not at risk, especially when they are simply monitoring as required under UN-sanctioned missions."

Following a visit to Taiwan by Speaker of the United States House of Representatives Nancy Pelosi, Anand told CBC News in August 2022 that "it is routine for legislators from our countries to travel internationally, and China's escalatory response simply risks increasing tensions and destabilizing the region." She called on China "not to unilaterally change the status quo by force in the region and to resolve cross-strait differences by peaceful means."

During her keynote address at the 2022 Halifax International Security Forum, Anand foreshadowed the release of the Trudeau government's Indo-Pacific strategy. She stated that Canada would "increase [its] military presence and enhance [its] defence and security relationships with partners and allies in the [Indo-Pacific] region." She added, "We will challenge China when we ought to. We will cooperate with China when we must."

On November 27, 2022, Anand announced the defence and security elements of Canada's Indo-Pacific Strategy. Anand said that the strategy will boost Canada's annual deployment of frigates to the Indo-Pacific from two to three, and that it would bolster participation of Canadian aviators and soldiers in regional military exercises. The Strategy referred to China as an "increasingly disruptive global power."

Personal life 
Anand is the daughter of Saroj Daulat Ram and Sundaram Vivek Anand, an anaesthetist and general surgeon. The couple immigrated to Kentville, Nova Scotia, in the early 1960s. Anand was born in 1967 and attended Queen’s University, the University of Oxford, and Dalhousie University. Anand articled at Toronto law firm Torys, where she met her husband, John Knowlton.

Anand, her husband John, and four children have lived in Oakville, Ontario, for 18 years.

Over her 18 years in Oakville, Anand has served her local community in a number of ways. She has served on the board of directors of the Lighthouse for Grieving Children, the Oakville Hospital Foundation and Oakville Hydro Electricity Distribution Inc. She was also the inaugural chair of the Ontario Securities Commission Investor Advisory Panel.

Anand was awarded the 2022 Global Citizen Award by the United Nations Association in Canada. The award recognizes "role models who have shown generosity, creativity, leadership and solution-seeking, and applied their talents to the challenges they have identified in their local communities, in the country and in the world."

Electoral record

References

External links

Office site
Bio from Prime Minister's Site

Living people
1967 births
Canadian people of Indian descent
Canadian people of Punjabi descent
Canadian people of Tamil descent
Canadian Hindus
People from Kentville, Nova Scotia
Academic staff of the University of Toronto Faculty of Law
20th-century Canadian lawyers
21st-century Canadian lawyers
Canadian women lawyers
Canadian politicians of Indian descent
Canadian politicians of Punjabi descent
Lawyers in Ontario
Queen's University at Kingston alumni
Alumni of the University of Oxford
Dalhousie University alumni
Defence ministers of Canada
University of Toronto Faculty of Law alumni
People from Oakville, Ontario
Women legal scholars
Members of the House of Commons of Canada from Ontario
Members of the 29th Canadian Ministry
Members of the King's Privy Council for Canada
Women government ministers of Canada
Liberal Party of Canada MPs
21st-century Canadian politicians
21st-century Canadian women politicians
Women members of the House of Commons of Canada
20th-century women lawyers
21st-century women lawyers
Female defence ministers